The chronology of the conversion to Islam of the companions of the Islamic prophet Muhammad has attracted scholarly attention. It is an important topic in the seera literature (biographies of Muhammad).

Background
The other early companion converts heard of the Islamic Prophet Muhammad's beliefs through the first converts, next converts and so on and even through the disbelieving non-Muslims, by word of mouth. It was primarily by word of mouth because oral communication was the primary means of spreading information. They heard of the open calls for the acceptance of Islam to the tribal leaders, calling to the worship of One God instead of many, critiquing their society, proposing solutions to various problems and requesting a collective reorientation of their dark-age society based on an Islamic worldview.

Earliest converts
The first converts to Islam at the time of Muhammad were:
Khadija bint Khuwaylid - First person to convert and first free female convert.
Ali ibn Abi Talib - First free male child in Muhammad's family to convert.
Zayd ibn Harithah - First freed slave male convert.
Abu Bakr - First free adult male and nobleman to accept Islam and also the first outside the clan of Hashim among the Quraysh.

First male Muslim
The identity of the first male to profess Islam is disputed. Shia and some Sunni sources introduce Ali as the first male convert, aged between nine and eleven. This is reported by the Sunni Ibn Hisham in his  recension of al-Sirat al-nabawiya by Ibn Ishaq. Similar reports appear in the works of the Sunni authors Ibn Sa'd and al-Suyuti. Ali also claimed to have been the second male Muslim after Muhammad in al-Qasi'a, a sermon attributed to him in Nahj al-balagha. Among contemporary authors, this is also the view of Momen, Nasr and Afsaruddin, Huart, Esposito, McHugo, Abbas, and Kelen, while Watt accepts the list of early Muslims in al-Sirat al-nabawiya as "roughly accurate."

Other Sunni sources identify Abu Bakr or Muhammad's adopted son Zayd as the first male convert. In particular, al-Tabari lists contradictory Sunni traditions about Ali, Abu Bakr, and Zayd, thus leaving the decision to the reader. Gleave is certain that these contradictory accounts are affected by later Shia and Sunni preferences, though he writes that the earliest existing records place Ali before Abu Bakr. Watt also comments on this topic, saying that Abu Bakr's status after Muhammad's death might have been reflected back into the early Islamic records.

Sunni sources often describe Ali as the first child to embrace Islam, while the significance of Ali's Islam has been questioned by Watt and the Sunni al-Jahiz. Alternatively, the Shia Ibn Shahrashub writes that Ali understood the message of Muhammad despite his early age, which he views as a merit for Ali. He adds that Jesus and John the Baptist were given wisdom in childhood, according to the Quran. About three years later, Ali is said to have been the only person to offer his support when Muhammad openly invited his relatives to Islam. Muhammad then called Ali his brother, his trustee, and his successor, which was met with ridicule from the infamous Abu Lahab, as reported by Shia authors and some others, including Ibn Ishaq and al-Tabari. In Shia sources, not only Ali was the first male convert but he also never practiced idolatry, having been raised by Muhammad from a young age. This places him in Shia view above Abu Bakr, who a middle-aged man at the time of his conversion.

Other conversions
Some other early converts were:
Zainab, Ruqayyah, Umm Kulthum, Fatimah - Among the early female converts, after their mother Khadija.
Umm Ayman - Among the earliest converts, being a member of Muhammad's household
Uthman - Fourth male convert, after Ali, Abu Bakr, and Zayd.
Yasir ibn Amir - One of the early converts
Ammar ibn Yasir - One of the early converts
Abu Dhar al-Ghifari- One of the early converts
Sumayyah bint Khabbab - Seventh person to convert
Sa'd ibn Abi-Waqqas - One of the first converts
Lubaba bint al-Harith - Second adult woman to convert
Bilal ibn Ribah - One of the early converts
Abd-Allah ibn Mas'ud - One of the early converts
Jafar ibn Abi Talib - One of the early convert
Abd al-Rahman ibn Awf - Among the first converts
Zubayr ibn al-Awwam - One of the early converts
Talha ibn Ubayd-Allah - One of the early converts
Khalid ibn Sa`id - One of the early converts
Abu Ubaidah ibn al-Jarrah - One of the early converts
Khabbab ibn al-Aratt - One of the early converts
Said ibn Zayd - Converted before Umar
Fatimah bint al-Khattab - Converted before Umar
Abu-Hudhayfah ibn Utbah - One of the early converts
Mus`ab ibn `Umair - One of the early converts
Asma bint Abu Bakr - About the eighteenth person to convert
Abd-Allah ibn Abd-al-Asad - Among the first people to convert
Umm Salama Hind bint Abi Umayya - Among the first people to convert
As-Sakran ibn Amr - One of the early converts
Sawdah bint Zam'ah - One of the early converts
Safiyya bint Abd al-Muttalib - Among the early converts
Hamza ibn 'Abd al-Muttalib - Converted in 616 CE
Umar - around the fiftieth or sixtieth or so person to convert, and he did so during

See also

Conversion to Islam
 List of notable Muslim records and milestones during Muhammad's era

References

Citations

Sources
 
 
 
 
 
 
 
 
 
 
 
 
 
 
 
 
 
 

+Timing